Vandellòs town 
Vandellòs i l'Hospitalet de l'Infant municipality
Vandellòs Nuclear Power Plant